Millerandage (or shot berries, hens and chicks and pumpkins and peas) is a potential viticultural hazard problem in which grape bunches contain berries that differ greatly in size and, most importantly, maturity. Its most common cause is cold, rainy or otherwise bad weather during the flowering stage of the vines though other factors, such as boron deficiency or fanleaf degeneration, may also play a role.

While millerandage will always cause a drop in yield, its potential impact on wine quality will vary, particularly by grape variety. For some varieties that are prone to uneven ripeness within a cluster, such as Sangiovese, Zinfandel and Gewürztraminer, the development of millerandage may be unfavorable due to "green flavors" from the potentially unripe grapes hidden within the cluster. For other varieties, such as Pinot noir or the Mendoza clone of Chardonnay, wine quality could be improved due to the reduced overall berry size and higher skin to juice ratio.

Causes 

The root cause of millerandage is the poor fertilization of grape flowers during the growing season. While this is most often attributed to bad weather, other factors such as nutritional deficiencies (particularly of the mineral boron which is needed to synthesis the growth hormone auxin and facilitate the movement of sugars in the vine) or viral infections can play a role.

Flowering and fruit set 
Usually flowering begins at the base of the inflorescence (cluster of flowers) and moves its way to the top. Following the apical dominance of grape vines, the uppermost shoots of the vine will begin flowering first with complete blooming taking place over 7 to 10 days. Ideally the temperature and weather condition for this period should be warm, sunny and dry to insure optimal flowering. For some varieties, such as Zinfandel and Merlot, flowering may be more staggered which poses a greater risk for inclement weather disrupting the process and encouraging millerandage. Some growers may try to encourage more synchronized flowering with the use of chemical treatments, such as cyanamide.

Following flowering, the flowers of the grape vine go through pollination and fertilization over the next 2 to 3 days. Here is another opportunity where incremental weather can influence the outcome with temperature drops below  potentially damaging the ovules of the flowers before they can be fertilized. Since grapevines are hermaphroditic (containing both male and female parts) and usually rely on self-pollination, the presence of wind to circulate pollen or insects usually doesn't influence the success or failure of the pollination stage.  While not as influential as temperature, the presence of rain can "wash off" the pollen from the stigma or greatly dilute the stigmatic fluid, causing the pollen to absorb too much water, swelling and bursting before it reaches the ovules.

Even in the most ideal conditions, usually only 20-30% of flowers develop into mature fruit with fully developed seeds and auxin production. If even fewer berries develop, the condition of coulure emerges while for developed berries, the number of seeds (or their absence) will influence the resulting size of the berries. Millerandge most often occurs when the partially fertilized grapes do not develop any seeds, leaving small (and potentially immature) berries present in a cluster of larger, otherwise mature berries.

Influence on wine quality 
While millerandage will always have an economic impact in reduced harvest yields, it may not always have a negative impact on the resulting quality of the wine. In some areas, such as the New World wine regions of Australia, California and New Zealand, the presence of millerandage in the a vineyard can be seen as a positive quality for a vintage due to the reduced average berry-size. Some growers will even use chemical sprays to deliberately encourage millerandage.

However, the small, seedless berries may never fully ripen and stay hard and green (with high acid) throughout the growing season. Some growers may choose to remove clusters with high preponderance of millerandge through green harvesting or choose to harvest the entirety of the crop later at higher ripeness levels to balance the high acid and potentially "green flavors" of the shot berries. Other growers will remove the grape post-harvest at a sorting table along with other MOG.

References 

Viticulture
Grape diseases